Dowlatabad-e Sheykh (also Romanized as Dowlatābād-e Sheykh; also known as Daulatābād and Dowlatābād) is a village in Lay Siyah Rural District, in the Central District of Nain County, Isfahan Province, Iran. At the 2006 census, its population was 73, in 21 families.

References 

Populated places in Nain County